Prabodh Dinkarrao Desai (14 December 1930 – 17 May 2004) or P. D. Desai was a former Chief Justice of several High Courts of India. He also held the additional charge of the Governor of the Indian state of Himachal Pradesh from 8 March 1986 to 16 April 1986.

Early life
Desai was born in 1930. He studied at Nava Dehra Primary School, R.S.Dalal Government High School and Union High School in Bharuch district. He passed from St. Xavier's College, Bombay and University School of Economics and Sociology Bombay. He completed his legal studies from Government Law College, Bombay.

Career
He got enrollment as an Advocate in 1955 and started practice on Civil, Criminal and constitutional matters. He also worked in the field of Taxation, Company matters in Bombay High Court and High Court of Gujarat at Ahmedabad. On 19 February 1970 Desai was appointed an Additional Judge of the Gujarat High Court. After two years he became the permanent Judge of the same High Court. He was transferred to Himachal Pradesh High Court and joined there as Chief Justice in 1983. He took over the charge of the governors of Himachal Pradesh for few days in these periods. In January 1988 Desai became the Chief Justice of the Calcutta High Court, thereafter transferred to Bombay High Court in 1991. He retired on 14 December 1992 from the post of the Chief Justice of the Bombay High Court.

References

1930 births
2004 deaths
Governors of Himachal Pradesh
20th-century Indian judges
Chief Justices of the Himachal Pradesh High Court
Chief Justices of the Calcutta High Court
Chief Justices of the Bombay High Court
Judges of the Gujarat High Court
20th-century Indian lawyers
21st-century Indian judges
University of Mumbai alumni